SuperLeague of the WABA League took place between 11 January 2023 and it will end on 21 March 2023. The four best ranked teams advanced to the Final Four. The points against teams from the same preliminary round were taken over.

Standings

Fixtures and results
All times given below are in Central European Time (for the match played in Bulgaria is time expressed in Eastern European Time).

Game 1

Game 2

Game 3

Game 4

Game 5

Game 6

Game 7

Game 8

References

External links
Official website

SuperLeague